Playboy Penguin is a character in the animated cartoon Looney Tunes, created by Chuck Jones. He debuted in 1949's Frigid Hare and he re-appeared in 1950's 8 Ball Bunny.

History
Playboy Penguin is a mute, ice-skating baby penguin that seeks out Bugs Bunny's help. In his debut episode Frigid Hare, the little penguin is being pursued by an Eskimo hunter in Antarctica until he finds Bugs Bunny, who helps him to help escape the hunter's clutches. Afterwards, Playboy Penguin whispers to Bugs that he can have his vacation in Antarctica, as the nights are six months long there.

In 8 Ball Bunny, Playboy Penguin ask Bugs to take him home; the duo ends up going on various misadventures while trying to get to Antarctica (despite it later being revealed that the little penguin was born in captivity in Hoboken), including encountering Humphrey Bogart.

Later appearances
The character appears in The Sylvester and Tweety Mysteries episode "Mirage Sale".

Playboy Penquin makes a cameo in the Tiny Toon Adventures episode "Prom-ise Her Anything" as a tuxedo.

In the Nintendo DS game Looney Tunes: Duck Amuck, Playboy Penguin makes a cameo as one of the character coins that the player can collect.

Playboy Penguin appears in Bah, Humduck! A Looney Tunes Christmas. He is first seen at the Luck Duck Superstore, being scolded by Daffy Duck, only for Bugs Bunny to reprimand him for this action. Around the end of the movie, Daffy Duck hires Playboy Penguin as an employee.

In the 1996 movie Space Jam, he appears in the scene right after Lola Bunny beats Bugs in the one on one. As Lola is walking out, he is seen standing in front of Wile E. Coyote. He also briefly appears in the 2021 sequel Space Jam: A New Legacy, seen in Bugs Bunny's flashback leaving Tune World alongside the other Looney Tunes.

He makes cameo appearances in the Looney Tunes Cartoons episodes "Happy Birthday Bugs Bunny!" and "Elf Help".

Playboy Penguin appears in Bugs Bunny Builders, but as a female, going by the name as Pauleen Penguin, a famous musician.

References

Looney Tunes characters
Fictional penguins
Fictional mute characters
Male characters in animation
Film characters introduced in 1949